NGC 371, also called Hodge 53, is an open cluster 200,000 light-years (61,320 pc) away located in the Small Magellanic Cloud in Tucana constellation.

References

External links
 
 The Rose-red Glow of Star Formation - ESO Photo release

Open clusters
0371
Small Magellanic Cloud
18260801
Tucana (constellation)